Saba Battery Club (also Saba Battery Physical and Cultural Gym) is an Iranian sports club based in Tehran, Iran. The club was founded in 2002شود

Teams
Saba Battery Football Club, competing in the Iran Pro League

External links
Official website

Multi-sport clubs in Iran
Sports clubs established in 2002